DVK (Interactive Computing Complex) is a Soviet PDP-11-compatible personal computer.

Overview
The design is also known as Elektronika MS-0501 and Elektronika MS-0502.

Early models of the DVK series are based on K1801VM1 or K1801VM2 microprocessors with a 16 bit address bus. Later models use the KM1801VM3 microprocessor with a 22 bit extended address bus.

Models
DVK-1
DVK-1M
DVK-2
DVK-2M
DVK-3
DVK-3M2
Kvant 4C (aka DVK-4)
DVK-4M

See also 
Elektronika BK-0010
SM EVM
UKNC

External links 
Articles about the USSR Computers  history
Images of the DVK computers
Archive software and documentation for Soviet computers UK-NC, DVK and BK0010.

Microcomputers
Ministry of the Electronics Industry (Soviet Union) computers
PDP-11